3 al rescate is the first animated film made in the Dominican Republic. It is based on an animated short titled 3 for the Banquet by Raycast Animation Studio. It was directed by Jorge Morillo and Luis Morillo, and written by Christian López, Edwin Gautreau and Lucy Bedeglez. It was also produced by Raycast Animation Studio and Antena Latina Films. It premiered on January 6, 2011 in the Dominican Republic.

Synopsis 
It tells the story of a goat (Enrique), a chicken (Frank) and a pig (Mauricio) who, after suspecting that they will become the Christmas Eve dinner, escape from the farm where they were to embark on an unusual adventure.

On their way to the unknown they form a close friendship with an unusual iguana (Bilpo), who rescues them from various situations in which they get involved due to their inexperience in a new world of freedom. Suddenly, a ruthless poacher (the claw) who is engaged in the illegal practice of selling endangered animals, kidnaps Bilpo to sell it to a collector of exotic animals.

Our friends, driven by a sense of loyalty and gratitude to their partner follow his trail to the big city (Santo Domingo) where with a group of captured animals carry out the most daring and dangerous rescue operation.

Cast 
 Cuquín Victoria as Vinicio the Cat
 Kenny Grullón as Frank the chicken
 Roger Zayas as Enrique the goat
 Antonio Melenciano as the Hunter claw Méndez
 Frank Perozo as Larry and Juanchy
 Panky Saviñón as Harry and René
 Irving Alberti as Don Nicanor and Alfredo
 Memo Cortines as Bilpo the iguana
 Luís José Germán Mauricio the pig and Camilo alligator
 Giovanna Bonelly as Miss Jiménez
 Alejandro Alfonso as Sammy
 Carolina Rivas as Manuela
 Dominique Bonelly as Lucy
 Tony Rojas as Mr. Ruffini

External links
 

2011 films
2011 computer-animated films
Dominican Republic animated films